Salakh (also Romanized as Şalakh; also known as Şalagh, Şelagh, and Selaq) is a village in Salakh Rural District, Shahab District, Qeshm County, Hormozgan Province, Iran. At the 2006 census, its population was 2,281, in 420 families.

References 

Populated places in Qeshm County